The 2009 German GP2 round was the fifth round of the 2009 GP2 Series season. It was held on July 11 and July 12, 2009 at the Nürburgring in Nürburg, Germany. The race was used as a support race to the 2009 German Grand Prix.

The race saw the return of the Nürburgring after the Hockenheimring hosted last year's event. Last year's feature race winner, Giorgio Pantano, did not take part. The sprint race winner Karun Chandhok did compete though.

The weekend was dominated by Nico Hülkenberg, who took pole, won both races and got fastest lap for both races. He is only the second driver to complete this feat, after Nelson Piquet Jr. did so in 2006. Hülkenberg left his home country with the championship lead.

Standings after the round 

Drivers' Championship standings

Teams' Championship standings

 Note: Only the top five positions are included for both sets of standings.

External links
http://www.autosport.com/news/report.php/id/76881
http://www.autosport.com/results.php?s=205&y=2009&r=20092010&c=2

Nurburgring
Nurburgring GP2 Race
Sport in Rhineland-Palatinate